Saleh Sultan Faraj (born 10 January 1963) is a Bahraini modern pentathlete and épée fencer. He competed at the 1984 Summer Olympics and the 1988 Summer Olympics.

References

1963 births
Living people
Bahraini male épée fencers
Bahraini male modern pentathletes
Olympic fencers of Bahrain
Olympic modern pentathletes of Bahrain
Modern pentathletes at the 1984 Summer Olympics
Fencers at the 1988 Summer Olympics
Modern pentathletes at the 1988 Summer Olympics